Murray Stuart McCully   (born 19 February 1953) is a former New Zealand politician. He is a member of the National Party, and served as Minister of Foreign Affairs from 2008 to 2017.

Early life
Born in Whangārei, McCully was educated at Arapohue Primary School, Dargaville High School, the University of Auckland, and Victoria University of Wellington. He has a Bachelor of Laws degree and is a qualified barrister and solicitor, working as a lawyer before entering politics. He had a long-term relationship with political journalist and columnist Jane Clifton, with whom he had two sons, which ended in the 2010s.

Member of Parliament

McCully first stood for Parliament in 1975 in Auckland Central, reducing Richard Prebble's majority to 289. He next stood for East Coast Bays in 1984, coming second to Gary Knapp.

In 1987, McCully defeated Knapp and entered Parliament as MP for East Coast Bays on Auckland's North Shore. He held that seat at three general elections.

At the 1996 election he became MP for the new seat of Albany before returning, in the 2002 election, as MP for the reconstituted East Coast Bays seat. McCully retired from parliamentary politics in 2017.

Over his career, McCully held senior ministerial appointments in both the Fourth and Fifth National Governments. He had a reputation as a party strategist, "fix-it man" and "Machiavellian Dark Prince."

Fourth National Government, 1990–1999 
McCully's first ministerial appointment was as Minister of Customs and Associate Minister of Tourism in 1991. He held later appointments under the premierships of Jim Bolger and Jenny Shipley as Minister of Housing, Minister of Immigration and Minister for Sport, Fitness and Leisure.

As Sport and Tourism Minister, McCully reportedly "headhunted" future Australian Prime Minister Scott Morrison to head up the new Office of Sport and Tourism.

Murray McCully resigned from his Tourism portfolio in April 1999 after questions were raised regarding his handling of the resignation and subsequent payout of members of the Tourism board. These questions culminated in a report of the Controller and Auditor General that deemed these payouts "unlawful," although the report accepted that all involved had proceeded on the basis of advice and "their genuine perception of what was in the best interests of New Zealand’s tourism industry."

Opposition, 1999–2008 
The National Party lost government at the 1999 general election and did not regain the treasury benches until 2008. During nine years of opposition, McCully held various opposition spokesperson roles including in the local government, housing, sport, state services, immigration, foreign affairs and defence portfolios.

McCully is understood to have been a key player in many of the leadership changes the National Party experienced while in opposition. McCully supported Bill English to replace Jenny Shipley as National Party leader in the 2001 New Zealand National Party leadership election, Don Brash to replace English in 2003, and Gerry Brownlee to replace Nick Smith as deputy leader in 2003. McCully was appointed "parliamentary assistant" to Brash and was reportedly the only MP Brash told about his decision to stand down in 2006.

Fifth National Government, 2008–2017 
After the National Party won the 2008 election, McCully was sworn in as a Cabinet Minister on 19 November 2008. McCully was appointed Minister of Foreign Affairs, Minister for Sport and Recreation, and Minister for the Rugby World Cup by New Zealand Prime Minister John Key.

In November 2015, McCully was off work after surgery for removal of a growth that was found to be benign.

On 15 December 2016, following the announcement that Key would retire from politics and the appointment of Bill English as Prime Minister, McCully announced that he would not stand for parliament in 2017 (in that year's general election). English and McCully had previously had a fractious relationship, relating to when McCully orchestrated the removal of English as party leader in 2003. Reflecting on his time as the Minister of Foreign Affairs, McCully said his most challenging and rewarding work was New Zealand's role in the Pacific: "I’ve put a lot of my personal effort into ensuring that we actually live up to the expectations our neighbours have of us and the responsibilities we should carry." He continued as Minister of Foreign Affairs under English until 2 May 2017, when he was succeeded by Gerry Brownlee.

In December 2016, McCully played a critical role in the United Nations Security Council Resolution 2334.

Political views 
In 2004, McCully voted against a bill to establish civil unions. In 2005, he voted for the Marriage (Gender Clarification) Amendment Bill 2005, which would have amended the Marriage Act to define marriage as only between a man and a woman.

In 2013, McCully voted against the Marriage (Definition of Marriage) Amendment Bill, a bill allowing same-sex couples to marry in New Zealand.

Awards and honours 
While still a Member of Parliament, McCully was appointed a Companion of the New Zealand Order of Merit for services to foreign policy in the 2015 New Year Honours.

In 2019, McCully was appointed an Honorary Companion of the Order of Fiji, for services to relations between Fiji and New Zealand.

See also
 List of foreign ministers in 2017
 Politics in New Zealand

References

External links

 Profile at National party

|-

|-

|-

|-

|-

|-

1953 births
Living people
New Zealand National Party MPs
New Zealand foreign ministers
Members of the Cabinet of New Zealand
Ministers of Housing (New Zealand)
Sports ministers of New Zealand
20th-century New Zealand lawyers
People from Whangārei
People from the Auckland Region
Members of the New Zealand House of Representatives
New Zealand MPs for Auckland electorates
Unsuccessful candidates in the 1984 New Zealand general election
Unsuccessful candidates in the 1975 New Zealand general election
Companions of the New Zealand Order of Merit
Companions of the Order of Fiji
21st-century New Zealand politicians